Hamilton County is a county in the U.S. state of Indiana. The 2020 United States Census recorded a population of 347,467. The county seat is Noblesville.

Hamilton County is part of the Indianapolis-Carmel-Anderson, IN Metropolitan Statistical Area. Since the beginning of the 21st century, Hamilton County has been the second most populous county in Central Indiana.

Hamilton County's roots are in agriculture. However, after World War II, development in Indianapolis grew northward, and towns in the southern part of Hamilton County developed as suburbs. Residential and commercial development have replaced many farm fields, although the county's northern part remains largely agricultural. In the first decades of the 21st century, the county is one of the fastest-growing counties in the United States. According to 2007 estimates by the US Census, the county's population increased from 182,740 in 2000 to an estimated 261,661 in 2007, making it the fastest-growing county of Indiana's 92. As of the 2010 census, Hamilton County has surpassed St. Joseph County in population, making it the state's fourth most populous. It is also the third densest in the state, after Marion and Lake Counties.

In 2010, Hamilton County was home to three of the state's 20 largest cities and towns: Carmel (8th), Fishers (9th), and Noblesville (14th).

Geist and Morse reservoirs are two man-made lakes in Hamilton County that offer boating, fishing, and waterfront living.

In June 2008, Hamilton County was named America's Best Place to Raise a Family by Forbes.com due to its strong economy, affordable living, top-ranked schools, and close proximity to Indianapolis. The city of Carmel in southwestern Hamilton County was designated CNN Money's top place to live in 2013 and in 2017, the city of Fishers was named best place to live.

History
The land containing Hamilton County was brought into the possession of the United States by the Treaty of St. Mary's in 1818. William Conner was the first white settler in the county. In the summer of 1822, after realizing there were enough settlers in the area, Conner and other settlers applied to the Indiana Legislature for a charter authorizing them to become a separate and independent county under Indiana law. The application was presented to the 1822–23 session of the Indiana General Assembly, and the act was passed and approved by the governor on January 8, 1823. The act took effect on the first Monday in April (April 7), 1823. The county commissioners first met on May 5, 1823, at Conner's house; it also served as the county circuit courthouse. The county was named for Alexander Hamilton, the first secretary of the US treasury.

Most Belgian immigration to Indiana occurred in the northwestern part of the state in Lake County and Porter County. However, in the 1890s, a significant number of Belgian immigrants also settled in the Noblesville area of Hamilton County. Similarly, chain migration led to numerous first generation Serbian immigrants who had settled in Indianapolis, and their Indiana-born children, to move to Arcadia, Carmel, Sheridan, Noblesville, and Cicero around the turn of the 20th century.

Like most of Indiana, the area was also heavily German-American, with Germans being the second largest single ethnic group in the county at the time, second only to so-called "native born whites" whose ancestry extended to the original Thirteen Colonies and who were the largest ethnic group in Hamilton County at the turn of the century. During World War I, Hamilton County was noted for an extreme rise in anti-German sentiment. The name of Wilhelm Street in Noblesville was changed to Washington Street and German-Americans were subjected to bullying and abuse from their neighbors. German-Americans were one of the largest ethnic groups in the county, but the remaining two-thirds of the county were "whipped into an anti-German frenzy" during which Germanness and Americanness were presented as being antithetical throughout the press. Hamilton County was labeled the "most anti-German county" in Indiana, although such attitudes were common throughout the rest of Indiana as well. During most of 1940 and 1941, Indiana as a whole was very isolationist, with much of the state preferring that the country stay neutral in the European conflict. However, Hamilton County was a "hot-bed of interventionist and pro-British sentiment", which stood out because unlike many other places in Indiana, most people in Hamilton County were in favor of American entry into the war, and were in favor of providing Britain with as much aid as possible as well.

Climate and weather

Hamilton County's climate thus falls within the Köppen climate classification system as a humid continental temperate climate, with pleasant spring and fall seasons surrounded by harsh cold and humid heat in the winter and summer, respectively.

Government
The county executive body is the Board of County Commissioners, which consists of three Commissioners representing their three respective districts.

District 1 consists of Carmel, which is coextensive with Clay Township. District 2 consists of Fishers, Noblesville, Delaware Township, and Noblesville Township. District 3 consists of Adams Township, Fall Creek Township, Jackson Township, Washington Township, Wayne Township, White River Township, Arcadia, Atlanta, Cicero, Sheridan and Westfield.

The current (2022) County Commissioners are:
 Christine Altman - District 1
 Steven C. Dillinger - District 2
 Mark Heirbrandt - District 3

The county's finances are managed by the County Council, which consists of seven members, four elected by district and three elected at-large.

District 1 consists of parts of Clay Township (45 precincts). District 2 consists of Delaware, Fall Creek, and Wayne Townships. District 3 consists of Noblesville, Jackson and White River Townships. District 4 consists of parts of Clay Township (17 precincts), Adams and Washington Townships.

The current (2022) members of the County Council are:
 Fred Glynn - District 1
 Amy Massillamany - District 2
 Steve Schwartz1 - District 3
 Ken Alexander - District 4
 Brad Beaver - Council member at large
 Steven Nation - Council member at large
 Sue Maki - Council member at large

Hamilton County is part of Indiana's 5th congressional district; Indiana Senate districts 20, 21, 28, 29 and 30; and Indiana House of Representatives districts 29, 32, 35, 36, 38, 39, 86, 87 and 88.

Politics
The county is located in Indiana's 5th congressional district, which is currently (2022) represented by Republican Victoria Spartz.

Hamilton County has long been reckoned as a classic Republican suburban stronghold. It has voted for the Republican presidential candidate at every election since Charles Evans Hughes in 1916. In 1912, Democratic candidate Woodrow Wilson had carried the county with a 3.06% plurality over Republican opponent William Taft. For years, Republicans usually won the county handily even in Democratic landslides. For instance, the county rejected Franklin Roosevelt in all four of his bids for president, and Barry Goldwater easily carried the county in 1964 with 61 percent of the vote. Since Wilson carried the county in 1912, a Republican has only carried it by fewer than 10 percentage points twice–in 1932, when Roosevelt held incumbent Herbert Hoover to 53 percent of the vote, and 2020, when Joe Biden held incumbent Donald Trump to 52.4 percent of the vote.

Hamilton County's loyalty to the Republican Party is not limited to presidential elections. The county regularly rejects Democrats in gubernatorial and senatorial races, and is typically one of the Republicans' strongest counties at the state level. One of the few times in recent memory that Hamilton County has supported a Democrat for governor or Senate was in 1992, when Evan Bayh narrowly carried it with 50.48 percent of the vote in his successful gubernatorial reelection bid. However, Bayh lost Hamilton County in his three bids for Senate. 

In 2016, despite his statewide dominance that year, Trump turned in the weakest showing for a Republican nominee in Hamilton County since Hoover, winning just 56% of the vote. Thus, Hamilton County voted less Republican than the rest of the state for the first time in almost 100 years. Hillary Clinton won 36.7 percent of the vote, only the third time since Harry Truman that a Democrat had won more than 35 percent of the county's vote. Eight years earlier, Barack Obama received 38.45% of the county vote during the 2008 election, the strongest result for a Democrat since Roosevelt in 1936. In 2018, Senator Joe Donnelly came within 10 percent of winning the county, winning 44.4% of the vote in his re-election loss.

In 2020, Joe Biden won the largest percentage of the vote for a Democrat in the history of the county (45.6%) while Donald Trump won the second smallest percentage ever (52.4%) for a Republican. It was the first time since 1936 that a Democrat even managed 40 percent of the county's vote, and only the second time in 88 years that a Republican had won the county by fewer than 10 points. Biden carried both Carmel and Fishers.

Geography

Major highways

  Interstate 69
  Interstate 465
  U.S. Route 31
  U.S. Route 52
  U.S. Route 421
  State Road 19
  State Road 32
  State Road 37
  State Road 38
  State Road 47
  State Road 213

Airport
 KUMP - Indianapolis Metropolitan Airport

Adjacent counties

 Tipton County — North
 Madison County — East
 Hancock County — Southeast
 Marion County — South
 Boone County — West
 Clinton County — Northwest

Cities and towns

 Arcadia
 Atlanta
 Carmel
 Cicero
 Fishers
 Noblesville
 Sheridan
 Westfield

Unincorporated areas

 Aroma
 Bakers Corner
 Boxley
 Clare
 Clarksville
 Deming
 Durbin
 Eagletown
 Ekin
 Hortonville
 Lamong
 Luxhaven
 Millersburg
 New Britton
 Omega
 Riverwood
 Roberts Settlement
 Strawtown
 Walnut Grove

Townships

 Adams
 Clay
 Delaware
 Fall Creek
 Jackson
 Noblesville
 Westfield Washington
 Wayne
 White River

Demographics

2020 census

2010 Census

As of the 2010 United States Census, there were 274,569 people, 99,835 households, and 74,755 families in the county. The racial makeup of the county was 88.5% white, 4.8% Asian, 3.5% black or African American, 0.2% American Indian, 1.2% from other races, and 1.8% from two or more races. Those of Hispanic or Latino origin made up 3.4% of the population. In terms of ancestry, 29.0% were German, 14.6% were Irish, 13.0% were English, and 7.7% were American.

Of the 99,835 households, 43.2% had children under the age of 18 living with them, 63.2% were married couples living together, 8.3% had a female householder with no husband present, 25.1% were non-families, and 20.5% of all households were made up of individuals. The average household size was 2.73 and the average family size was 3.19. The median age was 35.6 years.

The median income for a household in the county was $47,697 and the median income for a family was $95,376. Males had a median income of $67,221 versus $44,273 for females. The per capita income for the county was $38,500. About 3.6% of families and 4.5% of the population were below the poverty line, including 5.6% of those under age 18 and 3.5% of those age 65 or over.

Life expectancy
The life expectancy in Hamilton County in 2010 was 81.21 years, up 6.6 percent from 76.16 years in 1980. By comparison, the US national average in 2010 was 78.49 years.

Education
School districts include:
 Carmel Clay Schools
 Hamilton Heights School Corporation
 Hamilton Southeastern Schools
 Sheridan Community Schools
 Noblesville Schools
 Westfield-Washington Schools

See also

 National Register of Historic Places listings in Hamilton County, Indiana

References

External links
 Hamilton County Government
 Hamilton County Tourism, Inc.

 
Indiana counties
1823 establishments in Indiana
Populated places established in 1823
Indianapolis metropolitan area